Carlo Lamparelli was an Italian painter, active as a portrait and historical painter, who flourished about 1680. He was born in the town of Spello. He was a pupil of Giacinto Brandi.

References

17th-century Italian painters
Italian male painters
Italian Baroque painters
Umbrian painters
People from the Province of Perugia
Year of death unknown
Year of birth unknown